WVQS-LD (channel 20) is a television station licensed to Vieques, Puerto Rico. The station is owned and operated by Senda Educational Broadcasting, a subsidiary of Christian Television Network, Inc.

On April 15, 2015, WVQS-LD changed its affiliation with CTNi on channel 50.1 & CTN on channel 50.2, rebroadcasting WSJN-CD.

Its sister station is WUSP-LD 251 in Ponce (a CTNi affiliate). This station is also owned by Senda Educational Broadcasting, Inc.

Digital Television
WVQS-LD's digital signal is multiplexed:

References

External links

Vieques, Puerto Rico
Low-power television stations in the United States
Christian television stations in Puerto Rico
1990 establishments in Puerto Rico
Television channels and stations established in 1990